Integrative and Comparative Biology is the scientific journal for the Society for Integrative and Comparative Biology (formerly the American Society of Zoologists).  Prior to volume 42 (2002), the journal was known as American Zoologist .

See also
 List of zoology journals

External links
 Society for Integrative and Comparative Biology

Zoology journals
Oxford University Press academic journals
English-language journals
Scientific comparisons
Publications established in 1961
Bimonthly journals
Academic journals associated with learned and professional societies of the United States